The 1972–73 snooker season was a series of snooker tournaments played between July 1972 and April 1973. The following table outlines the results for the season's events.


Calendar

Notes

References

1972
Season 1972
Season 1973